India participated in the 2014 Commonwealth Games at Glasgow, Scotland, United Kingdom held from 23 July to 3 August 2014.
India fielded a strong 215 member contingent, which is third largest.
The sports ministry cleared the 215 athletes from 14 sporting disciplines, including seven para-athletes, at government cost, along with a contingent of 90 officials, coaches and support staff.
The Glasgow Games had 17 sports and 261 medal events. India did not field athletes only in three disciplines—Netball, Rugby sevens and Triathlon.
Vikas Gowda won a gold in the Men's Discus throw event, thus winning the first gold medal for India in men's athletics in 56 years.
Joshna Chinappa and Dipika Pallikal scripted history by winning the first gold for India in Squash at Commonwealth Games.
Kashyap Parupalli won a gold in Badminton Men's Singles, becoming the first Indian male shuttler in 32 years to win a gold medal in the singles event at the Commonwealth Games.
Dipa Karmakar won a bronze medal in Gymnastics at the 2014 Commonwealth Games – Women's vault, becoming the first female Indian gymnast to score a medal in the sport at an International Level.

Medalists

| style="text-align:left; vertical-align:top;"|

|  style="text-align:left; vertical-align:top;"|

Athletics

Men
Track & road events

Field events

Women
Track & road events

Field events

Badminton

Men

Women

Mixed team
Summary

Pool B

Quarterfinals

Semifinals

Bronze medal

Boxing

Men

Women

Cycling

Track

Sprint

Keirin

Time trial

Pursuit

Points race

Scratch race

Road

Diving

Men

Field hockey

Summary

Men's tournament

Pool A

Semi-Finals

Final

Women's tournament

Pool A

5th Place Play-Off

Gymnastics

Artistic Gymnastics

Men
Team Final & Individual Qualification

Individual Finals

Women
Team Final & Individual Qualification

Individual Finals

Rhythmic Gymnastics

Women

Judo

Men

Women

Lawn bowls

Men

Women

Shooting

Men

Women

Squash

Singles

Doubles

Swimming

Men

Table tennis

Singles

Doubles

Team

Weightlifting

Weightlifting

Men

Women

Note: In the Women's 53 kg category India's Swati Singh won the bronze medal and Santoshi Matsa was upgraded to the silver medal after the gold medalist Chika Amalaha of Nigeria tested positive for sample A and also for sample B and was disqualified after the hearing that took place on Friday afternoon (1 August)

Powerlifting

Wrestling

Men

Women
Repechage Format

Nordic Format

References

India at the Commonwealth Games
Nations at the 2014 Commonwealth Games
2014 in Indian sport